Aisha is a 2022 drama film written and directed by Frank Berry. The film stars Letitia Wright and Josh O'Connor. 

Aisha had its world premiere at the Tribeca Film Festival on 11 June 2022, and was released in the United Kingdom on 17 November 2022, by Sky Cinema.

Premise
While caught for years in Ireland's immigration system, Nigerian worker Aisha Osagie develops a close friendship with former prisoner Conor Healy. This friendship soon looks to be short lived as Aisha's future in Ireland comes under threat.

Cast
 Letitia Wright as Aisha Osagie 
 Josh O'Connor as Conor Healy
 Lorcan Cranitch as Peter Flood
 Denis Conway as Brendan Close
 Stuart Graham as Francis Manning
 Ian Toner as Liam Cantwell
 Ruth McCabe as Mrs. Keegan
 Dawn Bradfield as Michelle Campbell
 Theresa O'Connor as Deirde O'Dea
 Rosemary Aimiyekagbon as Moraya Osagie
 Emmanuel Hassan as Abdul Momoh
 Yemisi Ojo as Bes Emenaha
 Antionette Doyle as Habiba Momoh
 Tara Flynn as Catherine Levy
 Florence Adebambo as Ruykaya Momoh
 Aisling Reid as Louise Sheeran

Production
In March 2021, it was announced Letitia Wright and Josh O'Connor would star in the film Provision written and directed by Frank Berry. Principal photography began in April 2021. In June 2021, the film was renamed Aisha.

Release
Aisha had its world premiere at the Tribeca Film Festival on June 11, 2022. It also screened at the BFI London Film Festival on October 6, 2022. It was released in Ireland and the United Kingdom on November 17, 2022, via Sky Cinema.

Reception
On Rotten Tomatoes the film has an approval rating of 100% based on reviews from 6 critics.

Michael Nordine of Variety praises Wright for her performance, and the film for its naturalistic style, and concludes "The result isn't quite Kafka, but it’s closer than it should be."

References

External links

American drama films
British drama films
Irish drama films
BBC Film films
2022 films
English-language Irish films
2022 drama films
2020s English-language films
2020s American films
2020s British films